"Any Old Wind That Blows" is a song recorded by American country music artist Johnny Cash. It was released in November 1972 as the third single from his album Any Old Wind That Blows. The song peaked at number 3 on the Billboard Hot Country Singles chart. It also reached number 1 on the RPM Country Tracks chart in Canada.  The song was written by Deena Kaye Rose.

Chart performance

Notes

References

1972 singles
Johnny Cash songs
Songs written by Deena Kaye Rose
Song recordings produced by Larry Butler (producer)
Columbia Records singles
1972 songs